Simone Antonio Pacoret de Saint-Bon (March 20, 1828 – November 26, 1892) was an admiral of the Italian Regia Marina (Royal Navy).

Saint-Bon was born at Chambéry, now in France, then part of the Kingdom of Sardinia.

Leaving the Naval Academy in 1847, he attained the rank of commander in 1860, and that of vice-admiral in 1867. He took part in the Crimean war, distinguished himself in 1860 at the siege of Ancona, and was decorated for valor at the Siege of Gaeta. In 1873 he was elected deputy, and appointed by Marco Minghetti to be minister of marine, in which position he revolutionized the Italian navy. Falling from power with the Right in 1876, he resumed active service, but in 1891 was again appointed minister of marine.

He died at Rome on 26 November 1892, while still in office. He is remembered in Italy as the originator of the modern Italian fleet.

Two Italian Navy ships were named after him

The Italian battleship Ammiraglio di Saint Bon, commissioned in 1901
The Italian submarine Ammiraglio Saint-Bon, a Cagni-class submarine commissioned in 1940

References 
 (Note the error "Arturo" instead of the correct "Antonio".)
 Guido Almagià: SAINT-BON, Simone Antonio Pacoret de. In Enciclopedia Italiana, vol. 30, Rome 1936 (online at treccani.it)

External links 
 Item in the database Senatori d'Italia of the Italian Senate
 Item in the Portale Storico of the Camera dei Deputati

1828 births
1892 deaths
Military personnel from Chambéry
People of the Crimean War
Italian admirals
Regia Marina personnel
19th-century Italian military personnel